The Broad Front (FG) is a centre-left peronist political party in Argentina most prominent in the 1990s. The party is currently part of the ruling Frente de Todos coalition supporting the 2019 Argentine presidential candidate Alberto Fernandez during the 2019 Argentine general election.

History 
The party was set up by a group of left-wing Justicialist Party members of the Argentine Chamber of Deputies, most notably Carlos Álvarez, and other left-wingers who were dissatisfied with the neo-liberal policies of President Carlos Menem, including dissident Christian Democrats led by Carlos Auyero and also figures such as Graciela Fernández Meijide. In 1990, the rebel Justicialists, having formed FredeJuSo, came together with the Communist Party of Argentina and others in a loose coalition. Álvarez proposed forming a unified party and dissolving the constituent members, thus automatically excluding the Communists, who left.

In May 1993 they joined with Frente del Sur, a party set up by film-maker Pino Solanas, to form the Frente Grande. In the 1993 elections, the party's list in the city of Buenos Aires gained 38% of the vote and several deputies were elected around the country, including Álvarez, Meijide and Solanas. Solanas left the party a short while later over personal differences.

In spring 1994, Álvarez led the Frente Grande into a new alliance, creating the Front for a Country in Solidarity (FrePaSo). FrePaSo would continue the success of the Frente Grande and propel Álvarez to be vice-president of the country. The Frente Grande continued to be a force in Buenos Aires politics, but has become largely marginalised with the collapse of FrePaSo; its members have largely joined the new Support for an Egalitarian Republic (ARI) party or returned to the Peronists under centre-left Presidents Néstor Kirchner and his wife and successor Cristina Fernández de Kirchner.

What remained of the Front swung behind the Kirchners' ruling Front for Victory. At the 2005 legislative elections, however, some sections of the Front joined the Encuentro Amplio with other left-wing parties in Buenos Aires and Buenos Aires Province. The coalition did badly and lost its existing national representation.  In 2007, members of the Front including María José Bongiorno were elected as part of the Front for Victory. Of its leading figures, Nilda Garré serves as Minister of Defense and party leader Eduardo Sigal is a junior official in the sub-secretariat of American Economic Integration and Mercosur.

In 2012, the party had 161,050 members, making it the third largest party nationwide.

Electoral performance

President

References

External links
Official site

1993 establishments in Argentina
Communist Party of Argentina
Justicialist Party
Peronist parties and alliances in Argentina
Political parties established in 1993
Social democratic parties in Argentina